High-Tech Redneck is an album by American country music singer George Jones. It was released in 1993 on the MCA Nashville Records label and went Gold in 1994.

Recording
By 1993, Jones had recorded two critically acclaimed albums for MCA, but was still having a great deal of difficulty getting played on the radio, which was focused on younger, emerging stars.  The new album, which employed two producers, Buddy Cannon and Norro Wilson, was an attempt by MCA to broaden the singer's appeal, with biographer Bob Allen observing in his book George Jones: The Life and Times of a Honky Tonk Legend, "In 1993, the label released Hi-Tech Redneck, a new and oddly uneven Jones LP that tried to cast him in a slightly different and more lighthearted perspective, in hopes of breaking the radio deadlock."  It did not work; the album made it to number 30 on the Billboard country albums chart while the single peaked at 24—a very respectable showing in reality, considering the lack of radio play the singer was receiving. The other single from this album to make a chart appearance in Billboard was his duet with Sammy Kershaw, "Never Bit a Bullet Like This", a song also found on Kershaw's 1994 album Feelin' Good Train. The album was dedicated to Conway Twitty, who had died in June 1993, and features a cover of Twitty's "Hello Darlin'" to close out the album, which Jones had also recorded during his stint on the Musicor label.

"A Thousand Times a Day" was later recorded by Patty Loveless on her 1996 album The Trouble with the Truth, from which it was released as the second single, becoming a Top 20 hit for her that year. "The Visit" was later recorded by Chad Brock on his 2000 album Yes!

Reception

Jimmy Guterman of New Country magazine rated the album 4 out of 5 stars, saying that "Jones expertly walks through a series of boasts, gags... fables, and depictions of emotional devastation that suggest what Hank Williams might have sounded like had he lived to record using the Nashville sound." Guterman also praised the duet with Sammy Kershaw on "Never Bit a Bullet Like This" as a "riot", and noted of the album's cover of "Hello Darlin'" that it "succeeds both as a tribute to Twitty's style and to Jones' ability to wrench new ideas out of a song country fans have heard hundreds of times."

Track listing

Personnel
George Jones – vocals, guitar
Barry Beckett – piano
David Briggs – piano
Mike Chapman – bass
Sonny Garrish – steel guitar
Rob Hajacos – fiddle
John Hughey – steel guitar
Kirk "Jellyroll" Johnson – harmonica
Sammy Kershaw – vocals
Mike Lawler – keyboards
Brent Mason – guitar
Reggie Young – guitar
Danny Parks – guitar
Larry Paxton – bass
Steve Turner – drums
Lonnie Wilson – drums
Vince Gill – background vocals
Cindy Walker – background vocals
Dennis Wilson – background vocals
Chely Wright – background vocals
Curtis Young – background vocals
Nashville String Machine – strings

Certifications

References

George Jones albums
MCA Records albums
1993 albums
Albums produced by Buddy Cannon
Albums produced by Norro Wilson